The following is a list of the 134 municipalities (comuni) of the Province of Udine, Friuli-Venezia Giulia, Italy.

List

See also 
List of municipalities of Italy

References 

 01
Udine